The Minster School was an independent preparatory school for children aged 3–13 in York, England. It was founded to educate choristers at York Minster and continued to do so, although no longer exclusively, until in June 2020 it was announced that the school would close at the end of that term.

The building is Grade II listed.

Location
The school occupied today's 8 Minster Yard, part of a complex of buildings in York, directly across from the York Minster.

History

The school traced its origins to a "song school" founded in 627 by Paulinus of York, the first Archbishop of York, however the current school was re-founded in 1903. The Minster School had a strong focus on music and, of the 180 pupils, 40 were choristers at York Minster.

Buildings used by the school have been awarded listed status, among them the school house built 1830–1833, two houses dating back to 1837, and a Georgian building of 1755.

The school buildings were used to depict the House of Lords in the 2016 TV series Victoria.

Suspension of staff in 2018
In May 2018, the school attracted national press attention when the headmaster and two other senior members of staff were suspended after three ‘unsecured’ air rifles were found on school premises. The Dean of York faced protests by parents supportive of the staff and angry at the manner of the suspension.

Closure
The school had relied upon income from York Minster. However the Minster's budget for 2020 had been based on expected tourist income in the coming year. The effect on this of the COVID-19 pandemic caused the Minster to say that it was unable to continue assisting the school. The school announced that it would be closing for good at the end of the Summer Term 2020, and would help to find new places elsewhere for their existing pupils.

References

External links

 
 History of York Minster School
 Yorkshire Film Archive – Stillington, York, and Easingwold (1936–1942)
 Profile on the ISC website
 ISI Inspection Reports

Minster Yard
Grade II listed buildings in York
Choir schools in England
Educational institutions established in the 7th century
Defunct schools in York
7th-century establishments in England
York Minster
Defunct Church of England schools
Educational institutions disestablished in 2020
2020 disestablishments in England
Buildings and structures completed in 627